Stephen Scott Young (b. 1957 Honolulu, Hawaii) is an American artist best known for his watercolor paintings and etchings that depict everyday life on the east coast of the United States and the Out Islands of The Bahamas. Often painting genre scenes of quotidian life, Young's work is noted for his strikingly realist use of watercolor and eloquent simplicity of subject matter done in the American realist tradition. Young's copperplate etchings evidence a strident attention to detail and intricacy that suggest the influence of Rembrandt and Whistler. Though the images he creates are often nostalgic, his work deals with contemporary issues. Art historian Henry Adams wrote of Young in the late 1980s: "He is like one of those prospectors who has gone back to the tailings of an abandoned mine and where others saw only useless rocks found quantities of untapped, undiscovered gold." He has been exhibited nationally and internationally, and has work in major American museums, including the Cleveland Museum of Art, the Greenville County Museum of Art, and the Kemper Museum of Contemporary Art.

Biography 
Young's first interest in art arrived during his childhood when his mother gave him picture books of Caravaggio and Vermeer to copy. When he was fourteen years old, his family moved to Gainesville, Florida. Young attended the Ringling College of Art and Design in Sarasota, Florida, where he was trained in printmaking and began to paint with watercolor. In 1985, Young won first prize in a national art competition held by American Artist magazine. Soon after, he traveled to the islands of the Bahamas, which he has been depicting since. In addition to the Bahamas, Young has painted rural scenes of everyday life from the coastal northeast and southern United States, especially Vermont, Floria, the Carolinas, and the Californias

In May 2012, Young began exhibiting a retrospective of the past twenty-five years of his career painting the Bahamas. The opening at Christie's in New York City coincided with the publication of Once Upon an Island: Stephen Scott Young in the Bahamas by art historian William H. Gerdts.

Young is referred to as "the Winslow Homer of his day," with high-demand work.

He has been described as "A virtuoso realist in the classic tradition," and "an anomaly on the modern scene."

Young has been married since 1981 to Anna Farrington, who was a fellow art student at Ringling College of Art and Design in Sarasota, Florida. Farrington is a seventh-generation descendant of Bahamian settlers. The couple has two daughters.

Etchings and silverpoint drawings 

In addition to painting, Young has contributed a significant part of his career to developing the technique of etching and silverpoint drawing. Trained in printmaking at the Ringling School of Art and Design, Young keeps a press in his Florida studio.

In 2007, Young had his first solo etchings exhibition at the Montgomery Museum of Fine Arts in Montgomery, Alabama.

In 2012, Young exhibited etchings in Adelson Galleries Boston's Post War Works on Paper show.

Selected bibliography

Gerdts, William H. (2012). Once Upon an Island: Stephen Scott Young in the Bahamas. New York: Adelson Galleries.

Solo exhibitions
2013 – "New Works by Stephen Scott Young," Morris and Whiteside Galleries, Hilton Head, SC
2012 – "Stephen Scott Young: I'll Be Your Witness," Greenville County Museum of Art, Greenville, SC
2012 – "Freedom: The Art of Stephen Scott Young," Christie's New York in association with Adelson Galleries, New York, NY
2009 – "In the Copper: Etchings by Stephen Scott Young", Shuptrine Fine Art Gallery, Chattanooga, TN
2008 – "Stephen Scott Young, En Pointe!" Shuptrine Fine Art Gallery, Chattanooga, TN
2007 – "Stephen Scott Young, A Master Among Us" Montgomery Museum of Fine Arts, Montgomery, AL
2005 – "Remix: Stephen Scott Young," Greenville County Museum of Art, Greenville, SC
2004 – "A View from the Bahamas," Museum of Art Fort Lauderdale, Ft. Lauderdale, FL
2004 – "Stephen Scott Young: A Portrait of Greenville," Greenville County Museum of Art, Greenville, SC
1994 – "Stephen Scott Young: In the American Tradition," Jacksonville Art Museum, Jacksonville, FL
1993 – "Stephen Scott Young: In the American Tradition," Museum of Fine Arts, St. Petersburg, FL
1993 – "Stephen Scott Young: In the American Tradition," Arkansas Arts Center, Little Rock, AR
1993 – "Stephen Scott Young: In the American Tradition," The Butler Institute of American Art, Youngstown, OH
1989 – "Stephen Scott Young," Norton Gallery of Art, West Palm Beach, FL
1989 – "Stephen Scott Young," Hunter Museum of American Art, Chattanooga, TN

Selected group exhibitions 

2012 – "Post War Works on Paper," Adelson Galleries Boston, Boston, MA
2008 – "Masters of Watercolor: Andrew Wyeth and His Contemporaries," Greenville County Museum of Art, Greenville, SC

Selected collections 

Albrecht-Kemper Museum of Art, St. Joseph, MO
Arkansas Art Center, Little Rock, AR
Asian Museum of Watercolor Art, Haikou, Hainan Province, China
Brandywine River Museum, Chadds Ford, PA
Butler Institute of American Art, Youngstown, OH
Cleveland Museum of Art, Cleveland, OH
Greenville County Museum of Art, Greenville, SC
Kemper Museum of Contemporary Art, Kansas City, MO
Museum of Fine Arts, St. Petersburg, FL

Further reading
 Benoist, Laurent. "Stephen Scott Young," The Art of Watercolour Magazine March–May 2014
 Benoist, Laurent. "Stephen Scott Young," L'Art de l'Aquarelle (France)
 Wallace, Daniel. “Southern Masters: Stephen Scott Young," Garden and Gun Magazine October–November 2013
 Martin, Alison. “American artist’s watercolors offered at Christie’s sale,” The Examiner.com, May 8, 2012
 Gerdts, William H. (2009). Stephen Scott Young. New York: Adelson Galleries
 “Exhibitions: Stephen Scott Young,” American Arts Quarterly, Summer 2009
 Sessums, J. Kim (2007). Stephen Scott Young: Etchings. Alabama: Montgomery Museum of Art: Shuptrines Gallery
 Dewberry, Elizabeth. “Stephen Scott Young,” Southern Accents, May–June 2007
 “Museum Matters: Artist Stephen Scott Young exhibits copperplate etchings,” Art Business News, April 1, 2007
 Leeds, Valerie Ann (1993). Stephen Scott Young: In the American Tradition. Palm Beach: John H. Surovek Gallery.
 Kutkus, Kristina Montvidas. “Review/Informed Opinions,” Carolina Arts, June 1999’
 “Stephen Scott Young: Human Chiaroscuro," World and I, April 1993

References

Review, American Arts Quarterly, Volume 26, number 3
Kemper Museum of Contemporary Art
Albrecht-Kemper Museum of Art
Review, ''Carolina Arts
 Nolan, John M. A Guide to Historic Greenville, South Carolina, p. 132
Exhibition Announcement, Art Business News
Featured Artist: Stephen Scott Young: New Works April 15th through May 29th, 2009
Watercolor Paintings & Silverpoint Drawings by Stephen Scott Young, Watercolor Magazine, February 22, 2010
Stephen Scott Young: A Modern Master Explores New Subjects & Techniques, Watercolor Magazine,  March 16, 2010
Video Demonstration from American Artist magazine
Tampa Bay Magazine coverage of Stephen Scott Young acquisition, St. Petersburg Museum of Art, FL
Bay area arts patron ratchets up his support, St. Petersburg Times, July 20, 2003

Living people
American people of Bahamian descent
Realist artists
American etchers
American watercolorists
1957 births